Make Up is a 2019 British thriller film, written and directed by Claire Oakley.

It is Oakley's debut feature, set in a wintry caravan park in St Ives, Cornwall.

, the film had received a 98% score on review-aggregation website Rotten Tomatoes.

Plot
Ruth moves to a caravan park in Cornwall to live with her boyfriend Tom. There she meets Jade and starts to grow closer to her.

Cast

Molly Windsor as Ruth
Joseph Quinn as Tom
Stefanie Martini as Jade
Lisa Palfrey as Shirley
Theo Barklem-Biggs as Kai

References

External links

2019 films
2019 independent films
2019 LGBT-related films
2010s British films
2010s English-language films
British thriller drama films
British mystery thriller films
British psychological thriller films
Female bisexuality in film
Lesbian-related films
LGBT-related thriller drama films